Samuel Charters (May 18, 1863 – April 21, 1943) was an Ontario newspaper publisher and political figure. He represented Peel in the Legislative Assembly of Ontario as a Conservative member from 1908 to 1913 and in the House of Commons of Canada from 1917 to 1935 as a Unionist and then Conservative member.

Background
He was born in Chinguacousy Township, Canada West, the son of Francis Charters, and was educated in Brampton, Ontario. He married Jane Ellen Pierson in 1887. In 1890, he took over the operation of the Brampton Conservator. He was president of the Charters Publishing Company. He died in Brampton at the age of 79.

Politics
Charters was an unsuccessful candidate for a seat in the provincial assembly in 1902. He retired from provincial politics in 1913 due to illness. Charters served as chief opposition whip in the House of Commons from 1917 to 1930. He retired from politics one last time in 1935. Charters also served as mayor of Brampton in 1907 and from 1911 to 1912 and as registrar of deeds for Peel County.

References

External links 
Brampton : An illustrated history, HV Loverseed (1987)
 
 

1863 births
1943 deaths
Conservative Party of Canada (1867–1942) MPs
Members of the House of Commons of Canada from Ontario
Mayors of Brampton
Progressive Conservative Party of Ontario MPPs